Ulbster is a scattered crofting hamlet on the eastern coast of Caithness, within the parish of Wick, in the Scottish Highlands, within the Highland Council area. The town of Wick is located seven miles north of the village along the A99 road. To the south of the village, two miles along the A99, lies the ancient port of Whaligoe, where the famous 330 steps were cut into a cliff on the instruction of Thomas Telford in 1786.

History
Owned for many years by a cadet branch of the Sinclair Earls of Caithness, the hamlet is most notable for the Sinclair Mausoleum, within the grounds of the mediaeval St Martin's Chapel. Sir John, one of the Sinclairs of Ulbster, was a noted statistician who wrote the pioneering work Statistical Accounts of Scotland.

Naming
The name Ulbster comes from the Old Norse ulfr bólstathr meaning 'wolf's dwelling', though there have been no wolves in the region for many years.

Gallery

See also
Ulbster railway station

References

Populated places in Caithness